Alexander Yurievich Selivanov; born March 23, 1971) is a Russian former professional ice hockey left winger who has played in the NHL and also in various European leagues. He quit playing after season 2011-2012. He is currently coaching Admiral Vladivostok of the KHL.

Playing career
Selivanov was selected in the sixth round of the 1994 NHL Entry Draft, 140th overall, by the Philadelphia Flyers as an over-ager. He had previously played for the Russian club Spartak. Selivanov never played for Philadelphia, however, and made his NHL debut with the Tampa Bay Lightning, for whom he played parts of five seasons. He was later dealt to the Edmonton Oilers. During the 1999–2000 season, Selivanov briefly led the league in scoring, before injuries and a prolonged slump stopped him. He finished the season with 27 goals. After one more season, a disappointing one with the Columbus Blue Jackets, Selivanov returned to Europe, playing in Russia and Germany.

In January 2008 it was announced that he transferred from Germany to Switzerland to play with Fribourg-Gottéron in the National League A. In September 2009 HYS The Hague of the Dutch hockey league Eredivisie announced that Selivanov signed a one-year contract with them.

Personal
Selivanov was married to the daughter of Hockey Hall of Famer Phil Esposito, Carrie. The couple had two sons together, Niko and Rocco, as well as a son from her previous marriage, Dylan. Carrie Esposito Selivanov died on January 30, 2012, from an abdominal aneurysm.

Career statistics

Regular season and playoffs

Transactions
6 September 1994 – Philadelphia trades Selivanov to Tampa Bay for a fourth round pick (Flyers select Radovan Somik).
29 January 1999 – Tampa Bay trades Selivanov to Edmonton in exchange for Alexandre Daigle.
24 November 2000 – Signs as a free agent with the Columbus Blue Jackets.

References

External links

1971 births
Living people
Atlanta Knights players
SC Bietigheim-Bissingen players
Buran Voronezh players
Chicago Wolves (IHL) players
Cleveland Lumberjacks players
Columbus Blue Jackets players
Edmonton Oilers players
Füchse Duisburg players
Frankfurt Lions players
HC Fribourg-Gottéron players
HC Spartak Moscow players
HYS The Hague players
Krefeld Pinguine players
Metallurg Magnitogorsk players
Molot-Prikamye Perm players
Philadelphia Flyers draft picks
Russian ice hockey left wingers
SKA Saint Petersburg players
Soviet ice hockey left wingers
Ice hockey people from Moscow
Tampa Bay Lightning players
Ice hockey player-coaches